The Palisades Neighborhood Library is a branch of the District of Columbia Public Library in the Palisades neighborhood of Washington, D.C. It is located at 4901 V Street NW. A small sub-branch library opened in the neighborhood in 1928 and the current building opened in 1964, with a $8.2 million renovation completed in 2018.

References

External links 
 

Public libraries in Washington, D.C.
The Palisades (Washington, D.C.)
Library buildings completed in 1964
1928 establishments in Washington, D.C.